The following is the filmography of American actor, director, screenwriter, producer, singer, dancer, musician and pilot John Travolta. Travolta first became well known in the 1970s, after appearing on the television series Welcome Back, Kotter (1975–1979) and starring in the box office successes Saturday Night Fever and Grease. His acting career declined throughout the 1980s, but enjoyed a resurgence in the 1990s with his role in Pulp Fiction, and he has since starred in films such as Face/Off, Swordfish, Wild Hogs, Hairspray & I Am Wrath.

Filmography

Film

Television

Music video

Discography

Albums

Singles

Awards and nominations

See also
 List of oldest and youngest Academy Award winners and nominees – Youngest Nominees for Best Actor

References

Further reading
 Tast, Brigitte (ed.). John Travolta. (Hildesheim/Germany 1978.) .

External links

 

Male actor filmographies
American filmographies
filmography
Director filmographies